This is a list of diplomatic missions in Sri Lanka.

Diplomatic missions in Colombo

Embassies / High Commission

Other missions or delegations 
 (Delegation)

Consular missions

Hambantota
 (Consulate-General)

Jaffna
 (Consulate-General)

Kandy
 (Assistant High Commission)

Non-resident embassies and high commissions accredited to Sri Lanka
Resident in New Delhi, India:

Resident elsewhere:

 (Dhaka)
 (Helsinki)
 (Taipei)
 (Dhaka)
 (Hanoi)
 (Beijing)

Closed missions

See also
 Foreign relations of Sri Lanka

References

Foreign Missions in Sri Lanka

List
Sri Lanka
Diplomatic missions